Goggins may refer to:

Places
Goggins, California, a ghost town
Goggins, Georgia (also called Goggans", "Goggans Station", "Goggansville", "Goggins Station", and "Gogginsville"), an unincorporated community
Goggins Mine, a former gold mine in Placer County, California
Goggins Mountain, in Johnson's Shut-Ins State Park, in Missouri

People
Notable people with the surname include:

Coman Goggins, Irish Gaelic footballer
David Goggins (born 1975), ultramarathon runner and author; a former US Navy SEAL.
Juanita Goggins (1934–2010), American politician
Paul Goggins (1953–2014), British politician
Peter Goggins (1894–1917), British soldier who was executed for desertion during the First World War
Rodney Goggins (born 1978), Irish snooker player
Walton Goggins (born 1971), American actor

See also
Goggin, a surname